The 2016–17 season will be Rudar's 22nd season in the Slovenian PrvaLiga, Slovenian top division, since the league was created. Rudar will be compete in PrvaLiga and Cup.

Players
As of 29 June 2016

Source:NK Rudar Velenje

Transfer

Pre-season and friendlies

Summer

Competitions

Overall

Overview
{| class="wikitable" style="text-align: center"
|-
!rowspan=2|Competition
!colspan=8|Record
|-
!
!
!
!
!
!
!
!
|-
| PrvaLiga

|-
| Cup

|-
! Total

PrvaLiga

League table

Results summary

Results by round

Matches

Cup

First round

Statistics

Squad statistics

Goalscorers

See also
2016–17 Slovenian PrvaLiga
2016–17 Slovenian Football Cup

References

External links
Official website 
PrvaLiga profile 
Twitter profile
Facebook profile

Slovenian football clubs 2016–17 season